Tom Woodruff Jr. (born January 21, 1959) is an American actor, director, producer and special effects supervisor. He won an Academy Award for Best Special Effects for his work on the 1992 dark fantasy film Death Becomes Her; that same year he was also nominated for the same award for Alien 3.

Some of his most notable works include: The Santa Clause (1994), Starship Troopers (1997), Cast Away (2000), It (2017) and Jurassic World: Fallen Kingdom (2018).

Early life
Woodruff Jr. was born in Williamsport, Pennsylvania on January 21, 1959. He grew up in nearby Loyalsock Township, Pennsylvania and attended Loyalsock Township High School and graduated in 1977. Upon graduating high school he enrolled at Lycoming College in Pennsylvania where he earned a dual-degree in business administration and theater.

Career

Career success (1990–2010) 
In 1993 his alma mater Lycoming College awarded Woodruff the Dr. James E. Douthat Outstanding Achievement Award for alumni.

Woodruff was first credited in the 1984 film The Terminator as an assistant special effects supervisor. In the 1980s Woodruff was a crucial part of numerous films and television programs. In 1986 he was part of the Stan Winston Studios Effects Crew on The Vindicator. Also in 1986 Woodruff made his debut on screen, he played a Salvager and also worked as the creature effects coordinator on Aliens.

In 1988, Woodruff and fellow Stan Winston alumni Alec Gillis founded effects studio Amalgamated Dynamics, which soon became highly requested in Hollywood, with movies such as Alien 3, Death Becomes Her (both nominated for the Academy Award for Best Visual Effects, won by the latter), Demolition Man, Wolf and Starship Troopers. In the 2010s, Woodruff has continued to do practical effects in films such as Grown Ups 2, Ender's Game, Paul Blart: Mall Cop 2, Harbinger Down, Unnatural, It, Jurassic World: Fallen Kingdom and Godzilla: King of the Monsters. Woodruff has also played many creatures in the movie he did effects for, such as Gill-man in the 1987 comedy-action film The Monster Squad, the eponymous demon from Pumpkinhead, and the Alien.

It and Jurassic World: Fallen Kingdom (2017–18) 
In early 2017 Woodruff and his company Amalgamated Dynamics announced they would be creating and designing the cosmetics for Pennywise in the Andy Muschietti directed horror film It. In addition to Pennywise Woodruff and business partner Alec Gillis designed and built the dead bodies for the corridors for the film. Woodruff in particular designed and made the teeth for Pennywise with a great deal of comfort needed for actor Bill Skarsgård portraying Pennywise to be able to speak clearly and smile in a way needed for the film. His contributions in this area were recognized by Muschietti after the film's release when he said "... without all the hard work from Tom, Alec and all the guys Pennywise wouldn't have had such a big impact on the audience that it did.

Woodruff and his team received praise for their work on It. They were nominated for Best Makeup by Hawaii Film Critics Society and again at the 44th Saturn Awards.

Woodruff and Amalgamated Dynamics were the designers and builders of the life like dinosaurs in Jurassic World: Fallen Kingdom.

Recent and future projects (2019–present) 
In 2019 Woodruff served as the lead creature character designer for Godzilla: King of the Monsters. Also in 2019 he served as an executive producer for the short film Playtime which was released on March 9, 2019. He played Burke in the horror film The Mortuary Collection. In 2019 it was revealed Woodruff and his company would be used during the filming of Godzilla vs. Kong. The film completed filming in early 2020 and Woodruff was credited as miniature effects supervisor. In late 2019 it was announced Woodruff would serve as the creature designer for the upcoming Guest House film. Director Benjamin L. Brown confirmed Woodruff would have a role in his upcoming horror film Severed Road. Woodruff is also the executive producer in the upcoming science fiction film Wellwood.

Business ventures 
In 1988 Woodruff co-founded Amalgamated Dynamics a special and visual effects company based in Chatsworth, Los Angeles. To date the company has worked on over 150 film and television projects.

Personal life 
In 1983 Woodruff married fellow Loyalsock and Lycoming grad Tami Spitler. The couple have three children named David, Taylor and Connor. In 2013 Woodruff delivered the commencement speech at his alma mater Lycoming College. In 2019 Woodruff and his wife moved back home to Pennsylvania, settling back in their home-town of Loyalsock Township. Woodruff's son, David T. Woodruff, works in special effects and costumed acting like his father today.

Filmography

Film

Television

Awards and nominations

See also
 List of People from Lycoming County, Pennsylvania

References

External links

 Tom Woodruff Jr. at IMDb

1959 births
Living people
People from Williamsport, Pennsylvania
Male actors from Pennsylvania
Lycoming College alumni
Best Visual Effects Academy Award winners